Bay Oval is a cricket ground in Mount Maunganui, Tauranga in the Bay of Plenty area of New Zealand. The ground was built in Blake Park and opened in 2005.

Bay Oval has hosted men's and women's international limited overs matches since 2014. It hosted its first Test match in November 2019.

History
Blake Park was established in the 1950s. It was used by Northern Districts for List A fixtures between the 1987/88 season and 2001/02, with the team playing 24 matches on the ground in the New Zealand limited-overs cricket trophy. During the 1980s and 90s, large holiday crowds flocked to the ground to watch one-day matches, and New Zealand A played two matches on the ground against Pakistan A in December 1998. Northern Districts Women played two matches at Blake Park in the 2004/05 State League.

The Bay of Plenty Cricket Association constructed Bay Oval within the same site, with construction beginning in 2005. Northern Districts women's side played their first match on the ground in December 2007 and it held its first senior men's match in the 2008–09 State Twenty20 with Northern Districts playing Otago. Both sides have played on the ground regularly since, with it hosting its first first-class cricket match in April 2015.

The first One Day International (ODI) on the ground took place in January 2014 between Canada and the Netherlands as part of the 2014 Cricket World Cup Qualifier. In March 2014 New Zealand women's side played their first ODI on the ground and in October of the same year it hosted the first two ODIs of the New Zealand men's home series against the touring South Africa, but was not used for the 2015 Cricket World Cup later in the season. It has been used as a limited overs venue by New Zealand's men's and women's sides since.

In November 2019, when England toured New Zealand, the first Test match was played on this ground which New Zealand won by an innings and 65 runs.

In December 2020, the Bay Oval hosted its first Boxing Day test between New Zealand and Pakistan, where the home side defeated Pakistan by 101 runs.

In January 2022, during the first test match of Bangladesh's tour of New Zealand, Bangladesh defeated New Zealand by 8 wickets, their first win against New Zealand in New Zealand across all formats (in 33 matches) and their first test match win against New Zealand. It was also the first test match loss on home ground for New Zealand against an Asian side since 2011, when Pakistan beat the home side at Hamilton by ten wickets.

Records

Cricket Records

Test records

ODI records
 Highest ODI Total: 371/7 –  vs , 3 January 2019
 Highest Individual ODI Score: 140 – Thisara Perera,  vs , 5 January 2019
 Best ODI Innings Bowling Figures: 5/40 – Matt Henry,  vs , 5 January 2016
 Highest ODI Partnership: 163 (for the 2nd wicket) – Martin Guptill & Kane Williamson,  vs , 3 January 2019

Twenty20 International records
 Highest Twenty20 Total: 243/5 –  vs , 3 January 2018
 Highest Individual Twenty20 Score: 111* (51) – Suryakumar Yadav,  vs , 20 November 2022
 Highest Twenty20 Partnership: 184 (for the 3rd wicket) – Devon Conway & Glenn Phillips,  vs , 29 November 2020

See also

 List of Test cricket grounds

References

External links
Bay Oval at ESPNcricinfo

2005 establishments in New Zealand
Test cricket grounds in New Zealand
Sports venues in the Bay of Plenty Region
Cricket grounds in New Zealand